Los Mármol (The Rubbles in English, Os Rubbles in Portuguese) is a series of 6 animated shorts  spun-off from The Flintstones that aired during commercial breaks on the Latin American Cartoon Network in 2002. It is a parody of The Osbournes, a reality show that aired on MTV. The titles have been changed to Spanish and Portuguese but all the episodes are in English.

Overview 
The series parodies the format of reality shows including the constant moving of the camera and swearing. It is focused on the Rubble family and their everyday life.

Characters

Main 

 Barney Rubble, the main character who mostly seems annoyed and constantly uses swear words.
 Betty Rubble, Barney's wife, she is always there to help her husband, however seen in many occasions fighting with him.
 Bamm-Bamm Rubble, Barney and Betty's teenage son, he is an unemployed slacker and his father wants him to look for a job and move out. He has a crush on Pebbles which is not well-received by his mother saying that they are family.
 Hoppy, the Rubbles' pet hopparoo, he is shown to be playful and mischievous.

Recurring 

 Fred Flintstone, Barney's best friend and next-door neighbor, they are seen bowling together and having a BBQ with their families.
 Wilma Flintstone, Fred's wife and Betty's best friend, when Betty's not with Barney, she is mostly with Wilma.
 Pebbles Flintstone, Fred and Wilma's teenage daughter, she doesn't seem to share the feelings of Bamm-Bamm.

Episodes

Theme song 
The music of the theme song is based on "Rise and Shine", the original opening and closing theme during the first two seasons of The Flintstones, albeit with new song lyrics added.

Production
The series was produced by Cartoon Network, with creative direction by Fernando Semenzato, screenplays by Manoela Muraro, producer in the channel's creative department, and directed in two countries, Brazil and Argentina.
The acclaimed Brazilian production company Lobo Filmes animated the opening and closing sequences of the vignettes, and Hook Up Animation was responsible for animation of the episodes.

References

The Flintstones
The Flintstones spin-offs
Television series set in prehistory
2000s satirical television series